The National Basketball League (NBL), also known as NBL–Philippines or NBL–Pilipinas, is a regional professional basketball league in the Philippines.

History
On June 7, 2018, Celso "Soy" Mercado established the league and named National Basketball League Philippines to search undiscovered talents.

The league will feature an away-and-home format and will focus on giving homegrown players (aged 18–29 years old and a bonafide resident of the team's province, city or municipality) an opportunity to showcase their skills in the hope of making it to the professional and semi-professional leagues.

The league began its inaugural season on August 25, 2018, with 10 teams from Luzon. Games were played every Saturdays and Sundays. The Parañaque Aces became the league's first champions after defeating the Dasmariñas Ballers in the best-of-three championship round.

In 2019, the league expanded to 15 teams, while two of the founding teams folded (Marikina Shoemakers and Bulacan Makabayan). The Women's National Basketball League began their inaugural season on April 7, 2019.

The league's youth division, named NBL-Youth, began its season on May 20, 2019.

NBL Philippines Season 3 opened November 16, 2019, with 14 teams competing. (only Bulacan, Iriga, Rizal, Zambales, Imus & Cainta begged off from competing, while Marikina Best Shoemakers are returning to the league after a year absence)

On August 26, 2020. The Games and Amusements Board have accepted the NBL and WNBL's application to become a professional league. Both leagues will start its first season as a professional league in 2021.

After getting the green light to start from the Games and Amusements Board, the first professional season of the NBL began on July 18, 2021, at the Bren Z. Guiao Convention Center in Pampanga.

Format

Teams

Notes

Former teams

List of champions

Official broadcasters
Solar Sports is the official broadcaster of the game and airs NBL Games. Games are also livestreamed via the league's official Facebook and YouTube accounts.

The games were aired internationally via GMA Pinoy TV and streamed on the Net 25 Facebook page during seasons 2 and 3.

See also
 Philippine Basketball Association
 Pilipinas Super League
 Filbasket
 Pilipinas VisMin Super Cup
 Chooks-to-Go Pilipinas 3x3

References

National Basketball League (Philippines)
Basketball leagues in the Philippines
Sports leagues established in 2018
2018 establishments in the Philippines